The Oakland Stompers were a soccer team based out of Oakland, California that played the 1978 season in the North American Soccer League (NASL). The Stompers played in the Western Division of the American Conference and finished the year with a 12–18 record, in third place and out of playoff contention.

Team history
At the end of the 1977 NASL season, Silicon Valley businessman (and former owner of the San Jose Earthquakes) Milan Mandarić bought the Connecticut Bicentennials and relocated them to Oakland. The club, renamed the Stompers, hired Mirko Stojanović as head coach and signed a 10-year lease at the Oakland–Alameda County Coliseum, previously home of the NASL's Oakland Clippers in 1967–68.  The team signed Shep Messing for $100,000 making him the highest-paid American soccer player at the time.

The club drew 32,104 in their home opener against San Jose Earthquakes on April 2, 1978, with about half of those in attendance being supporters of the visiting team. After eight games and a record of 4-4, the team fired Stojanović and replaced him on an interim basis with Jack Hyde.  Hyde was in turned replaced by Ken Bracewell who had previously coached the Denver Dynamos.  In July, the team was averaging 12,200 fan in attendance, but ended the season in third place and with a slight dip in attendance 11,929 fans at seasons end. (The Coliseum was a lonely place in the summer of '78: the Stompers' co-tenants, baseball's Oakland Athletics, attracted just 7,218 fans per home date.)

Following the season, the team moved to Edmonton, Alberta where they was renamed the Edmonton Drillers.

Year-by-year

Honors 

U.S. Soccer Hall of Fame
 1997: Johnny Moore

Canada Soccer Hall of Fame
 2008: Bruce Twamley

Indoor Soccer Hall of Fame
 2019: Shep Messing

Coaches
  Mirko Stojanović
  Ken Bracewell

References

External links
 Roster

 
Defunct soccer clubs in California
North American Soccer League (1968–1984) teams
Sports teams in Oakland, California
1978 establishments in California
1978 disestablishments in California
Soccer clubs in California
Oakland
Association football clubs disestablished in 1978
Association football clubs established in 1978